Raghunath Chandorkar (21 November 1920 – 3 September 2021) was an Indian cricketer who played in seven first-class matches between 1943 and 1951. He celebrated his 100th birthday in November 2020, becoming India's oldest living first-class cricketer. From the death of Alan Burgess in January 2021 until his own death Chandorkar was the world's oldest living first-class cricketer.

See also
 Lists of oldest cricketers
 List of centenarians (sportspeople)

References

External links
 

1920 births
2021 deaths
Indian cricketers
Maharashtra cricketers
Mumbai cricketers
People from Raigad district
Cricketers from Maharashtra
Indian centenarians
Men centenarians